Ray C. Sims (January 18, 1921, Wichita - 2000) was an American jazz trombonist. He was the brother of Zoot Sims.

Sims played in territory bands in the early 1940s, then recorded with Anita O'Day and Benny Goodman shortly after the end of World War II. He worked with Les Brown (1947-1957) and Dave Pell (1953-1957), then with Harry James (1957-1969), and also worked as a sideman in the late 1950s with Charlie Barnet, Bill Holman, and Red Norvo. In the 1970s he played with James again and with Corky Corcoran; near the end of the decade he recorded with his brother Zoot.

References
"Ray Sims". The New Grove Dictionary of Jazz. 2nd edition, ed. Barry Kernfeld.

External links
 Ray Sims recordings at the Discography of American Historical Recordings.

1921 births
2000 deaths
American jazz trombonists
Male trombonists
People from Wichita, Kansas
Musicians from Kansas
20th-century trombonists
20th-century American male musicians
American male jazz musicians